Zeledon's antbird (Hafferia zeledoni) is a species of antbird in the family Thamnophilidae. It is found at low levels in humid forests from Nicaragua to Panama, and in the Chocó of western Colombia and western Ecuador. Zeledon's antbird feeds on insects, and regularly follows swarms of army ants in order to catch prey flushed by the swarms, but it is not an obligate ant-follower like some species of antbirds.

Zeledon's antbird was described by the American ornithologist Robert Ridgway in 1909 and given the binomial name Myrmeciza zeledoni. It was subsequently treated as a subspecies of the blue-lored antbird. A molecular phylogenetic study published in 2013 found that the genus Myrmeciza was polyphyletic. In the resulting rearrangement to create monophyletic genera Zeledon's antbird was moved to the newly erected genus Hafferia. The common name and Latin binomial commemorate the Costa Rican ornithologist José Cástulo Zeledón.

There are two subspecies:
 H. z. zeledoni (Ridgway, 1909) – south Nicaragua to west Panama
 H. z. berlepschi (Ridgway, 1909) – east Panama to west Ecuador

References

Further reading

External links
Xeno-canto: audio recordings of the Zeledon's Antbird

Zeledon's antbird
Birds of the Talamancan montane forests
Birds of the Tumbes-Chocó-Magdalena
Zeledon's antbird
Taxa named by Robert Ridgway
Taxobox binomials not recognized by IUCN